George Blackmore Guild (1834-1917) was an American Democratic politician. He served as the Mayor of Nashville, Tennessee from 1891 to 1895.

Biography
He was born April 8, 1834, in Gallatin, Tennessee. He attended the University of Alabama in Tuscaloosa, Alabama for two years and transferred to Cumberland University in Lebanon, Tennessee, where he graduated as a valedictorian. He was a member of the Beta Theta Pi fraternity.

He fought in the Confederate States Army during the American Civil War of 1861–1865. He served as Mayor of Nashville from 1891 to 1895, being elected in 1891 and reelected in 1893.

He was married on March 5, 1861, to Georgia Thompson. They had five children, Josephus Conn (1862–1907), William Thompson (1866-1895), Walter Keeble (1868-1872), George Mullins, and Maria (Westbrook) (1873–1954). He died in Virginia on April 21, 1917, and was buried at Mount Olivet Cemetery in Nashville.

References

1834 births
1917 deaths
People from Gallatin, Tennessee
Tennessee Democrats
Mayors of Nashville, Tennessee
Confederate States Army soldiers
People of Tennessee in the American Civil War
Cumberland University alumni
Beta Theta Pi
19th-century American politicians
University of Alabama alumni
Burials at Mount Olivet Cemetery (Nashville)